Teti, less commonly known as Othoes, sometimes also Tata, Atat, or Athath in outdated sources, was the first king of the Sixth Dynasty of Egypt. He was buried at Saqqara. The exact length of his reign has been destroyed on the Turin King List but is believed to have been about 12 years.

Biography
Teti had several wives: 
Iput, the daughter of Unas, the last king of the Fifth dynasty. Iput was the mother of Pepi I.
Khuit, who may have been the mother of Userkare (according to Jonosi and Callender)
Khentkaus IV
Neith

Teti is known to have had several children. He was the father of at least three sons and probably ten daughters. Of the sons, two are well attested, a third one is likely:
 Pepi I
 Tetiankhkem
 Nebkauhor, with the name of Idu, "king’s eldest son of his body", buried in the mastaba of Vizier Akhethetep/Hemi, buried in a fallen Vizier's tomb, within the funerary complex of his maternal grandfather

According to N. Kanawati, Teti had at least nine daughters, by a number of wives, and the fact that they were named after his mother, Sesheshet, allows researchers to trace his family. At least three princesses bearing the name Seshseshet are designated as "king’s eldest daughter", meaning that there were at least three different queens. It seems that there was a tenth one, born of a fourth queen as she is also designated as "king’s eldest daughter".
 Seshseshet, whose name was Waatetkhéthor, married to Vizier Mereruka, in whose mastaba she has a chapel. She is designated as "king’s eldest daughter of his body". She may have been the eldest daughter of Iput.
 Seshseshet with the name of Idut, "king’s daughter of his body", who died very young at the beginning of her father's reign and was buried in the mastaba of Vizier Ihy.
 Seshseshet Nubkhetnebty, "king’s daughter of his body", wife of Vizier Kagemni, represented in her husband's mastaba. She was maybe also born of Iput.
 Seshseshet, also called Sathor, married to Isi, resident governor at Edfu and also titled vizier. She also would have been born of Iput I.

 Seshseshet, with the name of Sheshit, king's eldest daughter of his body and wife of the overseer of the great court Neferseshemptah, and is depicted in her husband's mastaba. As she is an eldest daughter of the king, she cannot be born of the same mother as Waatkhetethor and therefore may have been a daughter of Queen Khuit.
 Seshseshet also called Sheshti, "king’s daughter of his body", married to the keeper of the head ornaments Shepsipuptah, and depicted in her husband's mastaba.
 Seshseshet with the beautiful name of Merout, entitled  "king’s eldest daughter" but without the addition "of his body" and therefore born of a third, maybe a minor queen, and married to Ptahemhat.
 Seshseshet, wife of Remni, "sole companion" and overseer of the department of the palace guards
 Seshseshet, married to Pepyankh Senior of Meir
The so-called "Queen of the West Pyramid" in King Pepy I cemetery. She is called "king’s eldest daughter of his body" and king's wife of Meryre (the name of Pepy I). Therefore, she is a wife of Pepi and most certainly his half-sister. As she is also an eldest daughter of the king, her mother must be a fourth queen of Teti.

Another possible daughter is princess Inti.

Reign and possible assassination

During Teti's reign, high officials were beginning to build funerary monuments that rivaled that of the pharaoh. His vizier, Mereruka, built a mastaba tomb at Saqqara which consisted of 33 richly carved rooms, the biggest known tomb for an Egyptian nobleman. This is considered to be a sign that Egypt's wealth was being transferred from the central court to the officials, a slow process that culminated in the end to the Old Kingdom.

The Egyptian priest and chronicler Manetho states that Teti was murdered by his palace bodyguards in a harem plot, and he appears to have been briefly succeeded by a short-lived usurper, Userkare. Teti was buried in the royal necropolis at Saqqara. His pyramid complex is associated with the mastabas of officials from his reign. Teti's highest date is his Year after the 6th Count 3rd Month of Summer day lost (Year 12 if the count was biannual) from Hatnub Graffito No.1. This information is confirmed by the South Saqqara Stone Annal document from Pepi II's reign which gives him a reign of around 12 years.

Third "subsidiary" pyramid to Teti's tomb
Teti's mother was the Queen Sesheshet, who was instrumental in her son's accession to the throne and a reconciling of two warring factions of the royal family. Sesheshet lived between 2323 BC to 2291 BC. This is the 118th pyramid discovered thus far in Egypt, the largest portion of its 2-metre wide casing was built with a superstructure 5 metres high. It originally reached 14 metres, with sides 22 metres long.

Once 5 stories tall, it lay beneath  of sand, a small shrine and mud-brick walls from later periods. Buried next to the Saqqara Step Pyramid, its base lies 65 feet underground and is believed to have been 50 feet tall when it was built.

Funerary temple of Queen Neith 
In January 2021, the Egyptian Ministry of Tourism and Antiquities announced the discovery of more than 50 wooden sarcophagi in 52 burial shafts dating back to the New Kingdom period, as well as a 13 ft-long papyrus containing texts from the Book of the Dead.

Archaeologists led by Zahi Hawass at Saqqara also found the funerary temple of queen Neith and warehouses made of bricks. Previously unknown to researchers, she was a wife of Teti.

See also
List of Egyptian pyramids
List of megalithic sites

References

Bibliography 

 Naguib Kanawati, Conspiracies in the Egyptian Palace: Unis to Pepy I, Routledge (2002), .

External links
The South Saqqara Stone: Sixth Dynasty Annals
BBC, In pictures: New pyramid found

23rd-century BC Pharaohs
 
24th-century BC Pharaohs
24th-century BC murdered monarchs
Pharaohs of the Sixth Dynasty of Egypt
Ancient murdered monarchs